Vivara is a satellite islet of Procida, one of the three main islands in the Gulf of Naples. (The other two are Ischia and Capri.)

Geography

Vivara is a crescent-shaped remnant ridge of an ancient volcanic crater, part of the Phlegraean Fields. In 1905, Giuseppe De Lorenzo described it thus:

History
Archaeological digs have uncovered fragments of Mycenaean/Late Helladic pottery together with Proto-Apennine and Apennine material, pointing to a Middle Bronze Age trading site (emporium). Surveys around the coast, have established sunken coastal installations, pointing to extensive fishing and trading facilities, now up to 18m below the waterline. It is assumed that the lowest of these installations predate the Avellino eruption of Vesuvius, while some of the later ones may be associated with the Late Helladic material found elsewhere around the island.

See also
 List of islands of Italy

References

External links
 Gruppo Naturalistico Isola di Vivara 

Islands of Campania
Volcanoes of Italy
Campanian volcanic arc
Tuff cones
Phlegraean Fields